Hedi Mokrani is a Tunisian football manager.

References

Year of birth missing (living people)
Living people
Tunisian football managers
Olympique Béja managers
AS Gabès managers
Stade Tunisien managers
EGS Gafsa managers